Haanja Parish was a rural municipality in Võru County, southeastern Estonia.

In 2017, it merged with Rõuge Parish, Mõniste Parish, Misso Parish, and Varstu Parish to create a new entity. It retained the Rõuge Parish name.

Settlements
Villages
Ala-Palo - Ala-Suhka - Ala-Tilga - Andsumäe - Haanja - Haavistu - Hämkoti - Hanija - Holdi - Horoski - Hulaku - Hurda - Ihatsi - Jaanimäe - Käänu - Kääraku - Kaaratautsa - Kaldemäe - Kallaste - Kaloga - Kergatsi - Kilomani - Kirbu - Kõomäe - Kotka - Kriguli - Kuiandi - Kuklase - Külma - Kuura - Leoski - Lillimõisa - Loogamäe - Lüütsepä - Luutsniku - Mäemurati - Mäe-Palo - Mäe-Suhka - Mäe-Tilga - Mahtja - Mallika - Märdimiku - Meelaku - Miilimäe - Mikita - Murati - Mustahamba - Naapka - Palanumäe - Palli - Palujüri - Pausakunnu - Peedo - Piipsemäe - Pillardi - Plaani - Plaksi - Posti - Preeksa - Pressi - Pundi - Purka - Puspuri - Raagi - Resto - Rusa - Ruusmäe - Saagri - Saika - Saluora - Sarise - Simula - Soodi - Söödi - Sormuli - Tõnkova - Trolla - Tsiamäe - Tsiiruli - Tsilgutaja - Tsolli - Tummelka - Tuuka - Uue-Saaluse - Vaalimäe - Vaarkali - Vakari - Vänni - Vastsekivi - Vihkla - Villa - Vorstimäe - Vungi

References

External links

Former municipalities of Estonia